Phaeobacter porticola is a bacterium from the genus of Phaeobacter which has been isolated from barnacle from Neuharlingersiel in Germany.) Phaeobacter porticola produces antibiotics.

References

External links
Type strain of Phaeobacter porticola at BacDive -  the Bacterial Diversity Metadatabase

Rhodobacteraceae
Bacteria described in 2017